Restrepiella ophiocephala, commonly called the Snake's head restrepiella is an epiphytic orchid native to Mexico, Central America, Colombia, and Florida.  The epithet ophiocephala is derived from the Greek words ὄφις, ophis (snake) and κεφαλή, kephalē (head).

Restrepiella ophiocephala grows from a short, creeping rhizome as a tufted, robust epiphyte to a length between 8 and 35 cm. The stout, cylindrical stem is erect and about 15 cm long and has a tubular bract. The fleshy, oblanceolate leaves  are 8 to 18 cm long and have a short petiole.  The tiny single flowers have a length of about 2 cm. They grow from the base of the leaves, one at a time, on up to four clustered inflorescences. They have a pale yellowish-brown color, dotted with dull purple spots. The outer surface is downy. The obovate, dorsal sepal is erect, while the lateral sepals are fused (synsepals) with a small split at their apex. The elliptic petals are much shorter and with ciliated margins. The fleshy lip is tongue-shaped. It occurs in damp forests alongside rivers at low altitude (40-1,600 m). The flowers are in bloom from winter to spring and are strongly scented.

References

External links 

Photos from Belize Botanical Gardens
IOSPE orchid photos, Restrepiella ophiocephala by J.Pfahl
Orchid photographs by Gary Yong Gee, Restrepiella ophiocephala
Lankaster Epidendra, Restrepiella ophiocephala
Santa Barbara Orchid Estate, Orchid of the Day: June 5, 2014, Restrepiella ophiocephala 
Czech Botany, ''Restrepiella ophiocephala'

Epiphytic orchids
Orchids of Florida
Orchids of Mexico
Orchids of Central America
Orchids of Belize
Orchids of Colombia
Plants described in 1838
Pleurothallidinae
Flora without expected TNC conservation status